Harpella forficella is a species of the concealer moth family (Oecophoridae), wherein it belongs to subfamily Oecophorinae.

Distribution
This species can be found in most of Europe and in the Near East.

Habitat
These moths inhabit deciduous forests, especially on hedge rows and sandy soils.

Description
Harpella forficella has a wingspan of 19–29 mm. These moths have a brown-yellow wing pattern, which is only slightly variable. They have conspicuously long, upturned palps. The caterpillars are light gray and have gray spots and dark hairy warts. Head and neck shield are brown.

Biology
The adults fly from June to September, depending on the location. They rarely come to light and sometimes fly during the day. The females lay eggs from late summer until autumn on the trunks of trees. The caterpillars live singly or in small groups on decayed wood, under bark, from September and hibernate till next spring. They feed on fungus mycelia on dead wood and take two years to develop. They have also been recorded to eat the sac fungus King Alfred's cake (Daldinia concentrica).

References

External links

 Waarneming.nl 
 Microlepidoptera.nl 
 Insecta.pro
 Digital Nature 
 J.K. Lindsey Commanster
 Nature Spot

Oecophoridae
Moths described in 1763
Moths of Europe
Moths of Asia
Taxa named by Giovanni Antonio Scopoli